Jean-Pierre Door (born 1 April 1942, in Sully-sur-Loire) is a member of the National Assembly of France. He represents the Loiret department, and is a member of The Republicans.

He won the 2018 Loiret's 4th constituency by-election.

References

1942 births
Living people
People from Loiret
Politicians from Centre-Val de Loire
Rally for the Republic politicians
Union for a Popular Movement politicians
The Republicans (France) politicians
The Social Right
Modern and Humanist France
Deputies of the 12th National Assembly of the French Fifth Republic
Deputies of the 13th National Assembly of the French Fifth Republic
Deputies of the 14th National Assembly of the French Fifth Republic
Deputies of the 15th National Assembly of the French Fifth Republic
French cardiologists
Members of Parliament for Loiret